Ace Young is the self-titled debut album from American Idol 5 contestant Ace Young. The album was released in July 2008 and sold 10,000 copies. The album features Young's single, "Addicted", which landed on number 77 on Billboard's Hot 100 chart.

Track listing
"Addicted" (Andreas Carlsson, Desmond Child, Kalle Engström, Ace Young) – 3:41
"The Letter" (Carlsson, Engström, Young) – 3:33
"A Hard Hand to Hold" (Child, Gary Go) – 3:17
"You Redeem Me" (Diane Warren) – 3:54
"Where Will You Go" (Ness Bautista, Child) – 3:20
"Fast Life" (Julian Bunetta, Sam Horbund, Young) – 3:35
"Young Money" (Bunetta, Young) – 3:47
"How You Gonna Spend Your Life" (Darrell Brown, Child, Kees Dieffenthaller) – 3:47
"The Girl That Got Away" (Carlsson, Child, Engström, Young) – 3:25
"Dirty Mind" (Carlsson, Child, Young) – 3:21
"The Gift" (Child, Engström, Young) – 3:41
"Addicted" (Acoustic) (Hidden) 2:28

Personnel

Maxwell Abrams – tenor sax
David Angell – violin
Chris Baseford – engineer
Ness Bautista – backing vocals, producer
Eric Bazilian – guitar, engineer
Pat Bergeson – harmonica
Bluu Suede – backing vocals
Drew Bollman – assistant engineer
Richard Bravo – percussion, engineer
Julian Bunetta – producer, engineer, mixing
Chuck Butler – acoustic guitar, bass, electric guitar, programming
David Paul Campbell – conductor, string arrangements
Randy Cantor – engineer
Andreas Carlsson – producer
Kirsten Cassell – celli
Will Champlin – backing vocals
Desmond Child – producer, executive producer
Brian Coleman – production coordination
Greg Collins – mixing
Steve Crowder – assistant engineer
David Davidson – violin
Donald Clive Davidson – violin
Sarah Deane – production assistant
Connie Ellisor – violin
Kalle Engstrom – keyboards, programming, producer, engineer, mixing
Marcus Finnie – drums
Ben Fowler – engineer
Gary Go – keyboards, programming, backing vocals, producer, engineer
Jules Gondar – engineer
Carl Gorodetzky – violin, contractor
Ali Helnwein – production coordination
Robert Ikiz – percussion
John 5 – guitar
Chris Kent – bass
Mika Lett – backing vocals
Lee Levin – drums, engineer
Thomas Lindberg – bass
Craig Lozowick – engineer
Gregg Mangiafico – keyboards, string arrangements, string conductor
Dan Muckala – piano, producer, engineer
Justin Neibank – string engineer
John Netti – assistant engineer
Justin Niebank – engineer
Jason Paige – backing vocals
Carole Rabinowitz-Neuen – cello
Lowell Reynolds – assistant engineer
Leslie Richter – assistant engineer
Jay Ruston – engineer
Pamela Sixfin – violin
Mark Smidt – horn
Harry "Slick" Sommerdahl – keyboards
Shane Swayney – guitar, programming, engineer
Will C. Thompson – assistant engineer
Alan Umstead – violin
Catherine Umstead – violin
Mario Valdes – assistant engineer
Gary VanOsdale – viola
Mary Kathryn Vanosdale – violin
Jon Vella – guitar, programming, producer, engineer
Dan Warner – guitar, engineer
Kris Wilkinson – viola
Chris Willis – backing vocals
Ace Young – backing vocals
Neil Zlozower – photography

Charts and sales

References

2008 debut albums
Ace Young albums